The Zeerust Solar Power Station is a  solar power plant in South Africa. It is a grid-connected, privately owned and privately funded solar power station.

Location
The power station is located near the town of Zeerust, in Ramotshere Moiloa Local Municipality, in the North West Province of South Africa. The geographical coordinates of Zeerust Solar Power Station are: 25°34'16.0"S, 26°04'20.0"E (Latitude:-25.571111; Longitude:26.072222).

Overview
The power is evacuated via a substation at Kameeldoorn and is sold to the national electricity utility, Eskom, under a long-term power purchase agreement.

Developers
The power station was developed by a consortium, which owns the station and goes under he name: Zeerust Power Company. The consortium comprises the corporate entities listed in the table below.

Construction and commissioning
The power station was constructed by Cobra Energia, a company based in Madrid, Spain. Construction began in January 2019. The completed power station began commercial production on 1 January 2021.

Other considerations
This power station was licensed under the Renewable Energy Independent Power Purchasing Programme (REIPPP). This program was designed by the Government of South Africa, with the objective of attracting "private investment in the renewable energy sector". The same consortium that developed and owns this solar farm, also developed and owns Boikanyo Solar Power Station, in Douglas, in Siyancuma Local Municipality, in the Pixley ka Seme District Municipality, in the Northern Cape Province of South Africa.

See also

List of power stations in South Africa
Eskom

References

External links
 South Africa: 75 Megawatts Solar Farm Comes Online As of 21 January 2021.

Solar power stations in South Africa
Ngaka Modiri Molema District Municipality
2021 establishments in South Africa
Energy infrastructure completed in 2021
Economy of North West (South African province)
21st-century architecture in South Africa